Jacques Almain (died 1515) was a prominent professor of theology at the University of Paris who died at an early age. Born in the diocese of Sens, he studied Arts at the Collège de Montaigu of the University of Paris.  He served as Rector of the University from December 1507 to March 1508.

Life

Beginning in 1508, Jacques Almain studied theology with John Mair at the College of Navarre in Paris. He received his license in Theology in January 1512 and his doctorate in the same subject in March of that year. When King Louis XII of France decided to support the 1511 Council of Pisa (or conciliabulum, as it was called dismissively) against Pope Julius II, the University was told to support this assembly.  The University chose Almain to reply to a polemical tract by Cardinal Thomas Cajetan, the Pope's most eminent apologist. Almain wrote a trenchant critique of that tract by Cajetan, but did not live to answer the Apologia the Pope's defender wrote in response.  Nor did Almain comment directly on the Fifth Lateran Council called by Pope Julius to counter the assembly in Pisa.

Works

Almain wrote in several academic genres. His earliest works were concerned with logic and the Physics of Aristotle.  His Moralia became a standard textbook of moral theology, presenting ethical issues in a dry Scholastic style.  He also wrote texts discussing portions of the Sentences of Peter Lombard. One text was concerned with the opinions of the medieval Dominican theologian Robert Holcot.

Apart from the reply to Cajetan, Almain wrote on political topics. These works included a discussion of the opinions of William of Ockham about papal power and a disputation on the power of pope and council, his earliest statement of Conciliarism.

Almain embraced the distinction between the absolute and ordained powers of God.  His moral philosophy was Aristotelean, arguing for conduct in the middle ground between extremes.  His political thought embraced the need for order but allowed a community to restrain any ruler whose conduct had become dangerous to its very survival.  Almain's critique of Cajetan's treatise on the papacy argued that Church and State were parallel in nature, both able to act against an errant leader, whether pope or king.  All of these teachings are found in the posthumous Opuscula (Paris, 1518).

References 
Conciliarism and Papalism, ed. J. H. Burns and Thomas M. Izbicki, Cambridge: Cambridge University Press, 1997. (Includes Almain's defense of conciliar supremacy.)
Burns, J.H., 1991, ‘Scholasticism: Survival and Revival’, in J.H. Burns and M. Goldie (ed.) The Cambridge History of Political Thought 1450-1700, Cambridge: Cambridge University Press, 1997.
Burns, J.H., 1994, ‘Jacques Almain on Dominium: A Neglected Text’, in Adrianna E. Bakos (ed.) Politics, Ideology and the Law in Early Modern Europe: Essays in Honor of J. H. M. Salmon, Rochester, NY: University of Rochester Press, 1994.
Kraye, J., 1988, ‘Moral Philosophy’, in C.B. Schmitt and Q. Skinner (ed.) The Cambridge History of Renaissance Philosophy, Cambridge: Cambridge University Press.
Oakley, F., 1998, ‘The Absolute and Ordained Power of God in Sixteenth- and Seventeenth-Century Theology’, Journal of the History of Ideas 59: 437-461.
Oakley, F., 2003, The Conciliarist Tradition: Constitutionalism in the Catholic Church 1300-1870, Oxford:  Oxford University Press.
Retallick, S., 2021, 'Political Theology the "Modern Way": The Case of Jacques Almain (d. 1515)', PhD Dissertation, McGill University.
Retallick, S., 2021, '“Ruling [the Church] to its destruction and leading souls to hell in masses”: violence, victimhood, and self-defence in the conciliarist discourse of Jacques Almain', in A. Gagne, J. Guyver, and G. Oegema (ed.) Religion and Violence in Western Traditions: Selected Studies, New York: Routledge.

Notes

Further reading 
Jacques Almain, A Book Concerning the Authority of the Church, in  J.H. Burns and T.M. Izbicki (ed. and transl.), 1997, Conciliarism and Papalism, Cambridge: Cambridge University Press.
Jacques Almain, Question at Vespers, in J. Kraye (ed.), 1997, "Cambridge Translations of Renaissance Philosophical Texts'', vol. 2: Political Philosophy, Cambridge: Cambridge University Press.

1515 deaths
University of Paris alumni
16th-century French Catholic theologians
Scotism
Year of birth unknown
16th-century French writers
16th-century male writers
French male writers
Academic staff of the University of Paris